HMS Spitfire was one of two s which served with the Royal Navy.  She was launched on 7 June 1895 by Armstrong Mitchell & Co. at Newcastle upon Tyne and sold off in 1912. Her fate is unknown.

Service history
Spitfire served in home waters. In early February 1900 she had repairs at Chatham, before joining the Medway instructional flotilla on 26 February to replace , whose crew under the command of Lieutenant Charles Pipon Beaty-Pownall turned over to her from 7 March. She underwent repairs to re-tube her boilers in 1902. On 7 May 1902 she was commissioned as tender to the cruiser , which itself served as a sea-going tender at Sheerness.

Citations

Bibliography

 

Swordfish-class destroyers
Ships built on the River Tyne
1895 ships
A-class destroyers (1913)
Ships built by Armstrong Whitworth